Papuexul bidwilli is a species of air-breathing land snail, a terrestrial pulmonate gastropod mollusk in the family Camaenidae. The habitat is up in the rainforest canopy, sometimes on epiphytes. A rare rainforest snail with a very patchy distribution that goes from Maryborough, south east Queensland to Forster, New South Wales.

References

 2006 IUCN Red List of Threatened Species.   Downloaded on 7 August 2007

Gastropods of Australia
Papuexul
Gastropods described in 1853
Taxonomy articles created by Polbot